Fugue in G minor, BWV 578, (popularly known as the Little Fugue), is a piece of organ music written by Johann Sebastian Bach during his years at Arnstadt (1703–1707). It is one of Bach's best known fugues and has been arranged for other voices, including an orchestral version by Leopold Stokowski.

Early editors of Bach's work attached the title of "Little Fugue" to distinguish it from the later Great Fantasia and Fugue in G minor, BWV 542, which is longer in duration and more challenging to play.

Score

The fugue's four-and-a-half measure subject in G minor is one of Bach's most recognizable tunes. The fugue is in four voices. During the episodes, Bach uses one of Arcangelo Corelli's most famous techniques: imitation between two voices on an eighth note upbeat figure that first leaps up a fourth and then falls back down one step at a time.

In Other Music
Sabaton (band) uses the beginning of the piece for their album The Great War (Sabaton album) in the song The Red Baron.

References

External links 
 
 Free download of BWV 578, recorded by James Kibbie on the 1755 Gottfried Silbermann/Zacharias Hildebrandt organ in the Katholische Hofkirche, Dresden, Germany

G minor
Compositions for organ
Compositions in G minor